Toabré may refer to:
Toabré, Burkina Faso
Toabré, Panama
Toabré River, Panama

See also
Toab (disambiguation)